Furie is a 2019 Vietnamese martial arts film directed by Lê Văn Kiệt. It stars Veronica Ngo, Cát Vy, Phan Thanh Nhiên, Phạm Anh Khoa and Trần Thanh Hoa. The film was released on 22 February 2019 in Vietnam and was released on 1 March 2019 in the United States. The film was released to positive reviews, with critics praising the action and Veronica Ngo's performance. It was selected as the Vietnamese entry for the Best International Feature Film at the 92nd Academy Awards, but it was not nominated.

Plot
Hai Phượng is an ex-gangster who is estranged from her family after her father disowns her for having an affair with a gangster and getting involved with criminal activity. After giving birth to her daughter Mai, Hai Phuong decides to lie low in the countryside and retire. She works as a debt collector, and barely supports her daughter or herself. Mai has been bullied due to Hai Phuong's reputation as a debt collector and for not having a father, and she wants to stop going to school so that she can support her mom. One day, while in the market Hai Phuong sees Mai being accused of stealing a wallet. The other witness pressures Hai Phuong to take their side, which hurts Mai's feelings and thus she ran away. It is then revealed that Mai was just returning the wallet to a drunk man who lost it. As Hai Phuong tries to find Mai, she quickly realizes that Mai is being captured by thugs.

Hai Phuong tries to catch up to the thugs, but she has to fight through many henchmen. After a lengthy chase, Hai Phuong barely loses them, but not before learning that the thugs are taking Mai to Saigon. Hai Phuong hitches a ride in a truck, and finally arrives in Saigon. She then tries to get help from her fellow gangster member, but she is rebuffed. Hai Phuong goes to the police, and steals reports of criminals related to missing children. Hai Phuong confronts a criminal named Trực, which results in a brutal fight where at first Truc gains the upper hand, but Hai Phuong manages to turn the tables and nearly kills him, but spares him because of Truc's mother.

Truc then tells Hai Phuong where the thugs are, and Hai Phuong finds their base of operations, which reveal that the thugs are using children as illegal child organ donors. She then defeats many henchmen, before facing the boss of the operation, Thanh Soi. Thanh Soi soundly defeats her, and knocks her out and tells her henchmen to throw Hai Phuong in the river, but not before Hai Phuong hears the train that Thanh Soi would be taking. Hai Phuong is rescued in the river by Detective Luong, but escapes with the help of a sympathetic nurse. Hai Phuong then goes to her brother for help, but he refuses to help her, due to him not getting over the fact that Hai Phuong betrayed their family to become a criminal and never came back to reconcile with them when she left the gangster life, and never attended her parents funeral, and tells his sister she is a terrible mother and Mai deserves better. Detective Luong finds Hai Phuong, and convinces her to team up with him.

Hai Phuong and Detective Luong finally finds the train, and both of them fight off the henchmen. While on the train, Thanh Soi tells her henchmen to change the train tracks on her signal, as well as split the train. Hai Phuong confronts Thanh Soi, and finally kills her, but not before the train tracks switch, splitting the train apart. Hai Phuong reunites with her daughter, and reconciles with her. Hai Phuong then quickly defeats the remaining thugs, but is shot in the chest by a random thug. The thug plans to kill her, but Detective Luong kills the thug. In the end, Hai Phuong is hospitalized and makes amends with her brother. Mai is treated well by her peers, and Hai Phuong promises Mai she will teach her how to fight.

Cast
 Veronica Ngo as Hai Phượng, an ex-gangster now living with her daughter in the countryside. She is skilled in Vovinam.
 Cát Vy as Mai, her daughter
 Phan Thanh Nhiên as Detective Lương, a detective also skilled in Vovinam.
 Phạm Anh Khoa as Truc
 Trần Thanh Hoa as Thanh Sói

Release
Well Go USA Entertainment officially bought the U.S. distribution rights for the film, which was released on 1 March 2019. The film is also available on Netflix from May 21, 2019.

Reception 
The movie was released to positive reviews. Nafees Ahmed of High On Films in his review writes, "it is a hyper-stylized martial art action film that packs clean and high octane action scenes." The movie broke the record for highest-grossing Vietnamese film in history.

See also
 List of submissions to the 92nd Academy Awards for Best International Feature Film
 List of Vietnamese submissions for the Academy Award for Best International Feature Film

References

External links
 
 
 
 

Vietnamese action films
2019 films
2019 martial arts films
Vietnamese martial arts films
Films about human trafficking